Dresconella is a monotypic genus of Spanish dwarf spiders containing the single species, Dresconella nivicola. It was first described by J. Denis in 1950, and has only been found in France.

See also
 List of Linyphiidae species (A–H)

References

Linyphiidae
Monotypic Araneomorphae genera